Gary Joe "G. J." Kinne III (born December 1, 1988) is an American football coach and former quarterback who is currently the head coach at Texas State University (TXST) in San Marcos, Texas. He was signed by the New York Jets as an undrafted free agent in 2012. He played college football at Tulsa. Kinne converted from quarterback to wide receiver in 2015 in hopes of making the Eagles roster in 2015, but failed to make the team. He was signed by the Calgary Stampeders of the CFL in 2016, and later signed with the Roughriders in June 2016 before moving into coaching.

Kinne is the incoming head coach at Texas State University, and will assume that position at the conclusion of 2022 season.

Early years
Kinne was born in Mesquite, Texas, a suburb just east of Dallas, to Gary Joe Kinne and Jocelyne Karr. His father was a former standout linebacker at Baylor University and later an assistant coach at Allen High School, Kaufman High School, and was the defensive coordinator at Mesquite High School. In 2003, his father accepted the head coaching job at Canton High School in East Texas, a town about 70 miles east of Dallas. Kinne became the starting quarterback of the Eagle varsity football team as a freshman. In his first game against rival Grand Saline High School, Kinne played well and exhibited a strong arm and good accuracy despite a 20–13 loss. It would be a rare loss as he led Canton High to its first playoff victory since 1964 and finished the year as Class AAA area finalists with an 8–4 record. He was named All East Texas and was named The Tyler Morning Telegraph's East Texas Newcomer of the year. As a sophomore, he led CHS to another good season with an 8–2 record but narrowly missed the playoffs. In March 2017 he married Summer Dawn McCall, a former Tulsa cheerleader.

Father's shooting 
In the spring of 2005, Kinne's father, who was also his coach at Canton High, was shot in the chest by the disgruntled parent of one of the players he coached. According to police reports, Jeff Doyal Robertson, the father of a player who had often complained to coaches and administrators regarding the way his son was treated, walked into the Canton Fieldhouse and shot Coach Kinne at point blank range. Robertson then fled in his pickup truck and headed east towards Tyler, Texas. Kinne Sr. was on the phone with another coach who was at another school when he was shot. Kinne Jr. was taken by police into protective custody, and then told that his father had died when in fact he had survived despite being given only a 10% chance to live. Robertson was later apprehended in an area north of Tyler near Interstate 20 where he had slashed his wrists in an apparent suicide attempt. Robertson was convicted of aggravated assault with a deadly weapon and was sentenced to 20 years in prison.

Senior year
After the shooting, Kinne stayed one more year at Canton High School, leading the team to its best season in school history with a 12–2 record, losing to Tatum High School, the eventual state champion. After the 2005 season, Kinne's father, who had recovered from his wounds, was offered a job at Baylor University, which he accepted. Kinne then decided to move to Gilmer, Texas about 70 miles to the east of Canton, to live with his mother and step-father. The decision to move was controversial as many speculated that Kinne moved for athletic reasons, which is prohibited by the UIL, the governing body of Texas High school athletics. Kinne enrolled at Gilmer High School and became the starting quarterback, leading the Buckeyes to a 10–0 record, but was upset in the first round of the playoffs by Liberty-Eylau High School. He finished his career with 11,695 passing yards and 130 touchdown passes. He also rushed 3,327 yards with 48 touchdowns.

Kinne committed to Texas on December 28, 2006. Kinne also received football scholarships from Baylor, Florida, Nebraska, Oklahoma and Tennessee.

College career
Kinne attended the University of Texas at Austin as a redshirt freshman in 2007, but was buried in the depth chart and decided to transfer. On May 7, 2008, he announced that he would transfer to the University of Tulsa. After sitting out the 2008 season due to transfer rules, Kinne became the starting quarterback for the Golden Hurricane in 2009 and remained the starter throughout his career. He finished his career with 9,472 yards and 81 touchdowns. In January 2012, Kinne was named MVP of the NFLPA Collegiate Bowl.

Professional career

New York Jets
Kinne signed with the New York Jets as an undrafted free agent on April 28, 2012. He was waived by the team  on June 28.

Omaha Nighthawks
Kinne joined the roster of the Omaha Nighthawks of the United Football League for their 2012 season. The United Football League folded later that year.

San Antonio Talons
Kinne signed with the San Antonio Talons of the Arena Football League in December 2012.

Philadelphia Eagles
On February 28, 2013, Kinne signed with the Philadelphia Eagles, and he was released on August 30, 2013.  On October 22, 2013 Kinne was re-signed to the Eagles practice squad because of injuries to both of its top quarterbacks, Michael Vick and Nick Foles. Kinne was signed to a futures contract with the Eagles in January 2014. He was released on August 30, but signed to the practice squad the next day. Kinne signed a futures contract with the Eagles on December 30, 2014. He converted to wide receiver in May 2015. On Sunday, August 30, 2015, Kinne was again waived by the Eagles.

New York Giants
On September 9, 2015, Kinne was signed by the New York Giants and was placed on the practice squad. On September 16, 2015, he was released by the Giants. On September 30, 2015, he was re-signed to the Giants' practice squad. On January 4, 2016, Kinne signed a reserve/future contract with the Giants. On May 5, 2016, the Giants waived Kinne.

Calgary Stampeders
Kinne signed with the Calgary Stampeders of the Canadian Football League (CFL) on June 13, 2016. Less than a week later, on June 19, 2016, Kinne was released by the team.

Saskatchewan Roughriders
Signed with the Saskatchewan Roughriders (CFL) on June 24, 2016. Kinne made his CFL debut in the final game of the 2016 CFL season, completing 4 of 11 pass attempts for 24 yards. Kinne announced his retirement from professional football on May 9, 2017.

Coaching career

Early coaching career
In 2017, Kinne was hired as an assistant coach with SMU under coach Chad Morris. When Morris joined the University of Arkansas before SMU played in the Frisco Bowl, new head coach Sonny Dykes chose to have Kinne serve as offensive coordinator and play caller for the bowl game. Kinne eventually followed Morris to Arkansas in 2018 as an offensive analyst.

On February 25, 2019, Kinne was named an offensive assistant coach for the Philadelphia Eagles, working with special projects.

Hawaii
On January 31, 2020, it was announced that Kinne was leaving the Eagles to become the offensive coordinator for the University of Hawaii under head coach Todd Graham.

UCF
Kinne joined the staff at UCF as their co-offensive coordinator and quarterbacks coach in 2021. Having previously played and been mentored by Gus Malzahn at Tulsa.

Incarnate Word
On December 21, 2021, Kinne was announced as the new head football coach at the University of the Incarnate Word (UIW).

Texas State 
Texas State University hired Kinne on December 2, 2022, to replace Jake Spavital. Kinne took over following the conclusion of Incarnate Word's season.

Head coaching record

References

External links
 Incarnate Word profile
 SMU profile
 Texas bio
 Tulsa bio

1988 births
Living people
American football quarterbacks
American football wide receivers
American players of Canadian football
Canadian football quarterbacks
Arkansas Razorbacks football coaches
Calgary Stampeders players
Hawaii Rainbow Warriors football coaches
Incarnate Word Cardinals football coaches
New York Giants players
New York Jets players
Omaha Nighthawks players
Philadelphia Eagles coaches
Philadelphia Eagles players
San Antonio Talons players
Saskatchewan Roughriders players
SMU Mustangs football coaches
Texas State Bobcats football coaches
Tulsa Golden Hurricane football players
UCF Knights football coaches
People from Gilmer, Texas
People from Mesquite, Texas
Coaches of American football from Texas
Players of American football from Texas
Texas Longhorns football players